Natalija Todorovska, née Natalia Malakhova (born 7 July 1974) is a Russian and then Macedonian handball player. 

After playing many years for the Volgograd Akva, she went to the Macedonian Champions club Kometal Gjorče Petrov Skopje in 2001.

Awarded as the best right wing of the 1997 World Championship with Russia, she lately played for the Macedonian team. At the 2005 World Championship, she scored 21 goals against Cameroon and at the 2008 European Women's Handball Championship she finished the fifth top goalscorer.

On 24 March 2009, Natalija Todorovska was awarded the Medal for Service to the Country by the president of the Republic of Macedonia for acknowledgement of her sport achievements and her contribution to developing and popularizing sport in Macedonia as well as promoting the country abroad.

References

1974 births
Living people
Russian female handball players
Macedonian female handball players
RK Podravka Koprivnica players
Russian emigrants to North Macedonia